Ljiljana Blagojević (born 5 November 1955 in Belgrade, Serbia [then part of PR Serbia in Yugoslavia]) is a Serbian theater, film, and television actress.  She is married to Serbian playwright Siniša Kovačević; together, they have one daughter named , who is also an actress.

Her roles include Lucio Fulci's Aenigma.

External links 
 Ljiljana Blagojević at the Internet Movie Database

1955 births
Living people
Actresses from Belgrade
20th-century Serbian actresses
21st-century Serbian actresses
Serbian film actresses
Serbian television actresses
Serbian stage actresses
Serbian voice actresses
Žanka Stokić award winners